The "National Anthem of Chile", also known as "" or by its incipit "" ('How pure, Chile, is your blue sky'), was adopted in 1828. It has a history of two lyrics and two melodies that made up three different versions. The current version was composed by Ramón Carnicer, with words by Eusebio Lillo, and has six parts plus the chorus.

History

First national anthem
The first Chilean national anthem dates back to 1819, when the government called for, on 13 January, the creation of music and lyrics for this purpose.

The composer Manuel Robles and the poet Bernardo de Vera y Pintado fulfilled this mandate and their "National Song" debuted on 20 August 1820 in the Domingo Arteaga theater, although other historians claim that it was played and sung during the festivities of September 1819.

In the beginning, everyone would stand for the song. The custom of always singing it at the theater slowly disappeared, until it was requested that it only be sung at the anniversary of the country.

The doctor Bernardo Vera, known in the history of the independence, was the author of the verses that were sung to Robles' music.

This first hymn was sung until 1828, when it was replaced with what is sung today.

Second national anthem
The second and current Chilean national anthem was composed by the Spanish composer Ramón Carnicer, when he was exiled in England because of his liberal ideas. Mariano Egaña, Chilean Minister in London, acting on the criticism that Robles' song was receiving, asked Carnicer to compose a new hymn with Bernardo de Vera's original text.

The Spanish musician probably wrote the work by 1827, the date he returned to Barcelona, and his hymn debuted in Santiago, in the Arteaga theater, 23 December 1828.

Years later, in 1847, the Chilean government entrusted the young poet Eusebio Lillo with a new text that would replace the anti-Spain poem of Vera y Pintado, and after being analyzed by Andrés Bello, retained the original chorus ("Dulce patria, recibe los votos..."). The lyrics were slightly revised in 1909.

During the military dictatorship (1973–1990) of Augusto Pinochet, the Verse III was officially incorporated because of his praise of the armed forces and the national police (Carabineros). After the end of Pinochet's regime, in 1990, it was only sung in military events. Supporters from the former military junta also sing the anthem with the Verse III in private ceremonies and rallies, with continuous controversies over the following years because of the crescent general consensus of the crimes against humanity committed by the regime.

In the celebrations marking the return of democracy in March 1990 at Santiago's Estadio Nacional Julio Martínez Prádanos, the anthem was played in its present melody, raised to F Major (the Royal Musical Official Version of the anthem) which is the original melody of the second anthem by Carnicer, but using the 1847 lyrics as text, save for the original chorus of the 1819 anthem. This was the version that from 1991 to 2000 was played before broadcasts of Chilean presidential addresses. In 2000, it was replaced by a more stylized version, which was used until 2010. After that, the anthem was scrapped off the addresses. Since the end of the dictatorship, television stations rarely ever used the anthem during their sign-on and sign-off, and the practice fell off definitely during the 1990s. Radio stations in Chile still have a tradition to play the anthem in New Year's Eve, in order to start celebrations. 

Joe Walsh, famed musician who was part of the United States rock band the Eagles, sang the National Anthem of Chile at a Los Angeles Angels of Anaheim baseball game in 2003.

There is also a translation in Mapudungun, the largest and most-commonly spoken indigenous language in Chile, spoken by the Mapuche people.

Lyrics

Official lyrics 

Below are the lyrics of the most played version; it corresponds to verse V of the full version and the chorus.

Full lyrics 
According to Chilean Constitution [decree 260], only the fifth verse and the chorus are played officially as the National Anthem.

1973–1990 lyrics 
The following lyrics were used during the military regime in the country. Both the 5th and 3rd verses were used.

Notes

References

External links

 Himno Nacional Nueva versión
 Chile - Canción Patriótica Nro. 2 (ca 1810) 
 Chile: Himno Nacional de Chile - Audio of the national anthem of Chile, with information and lyrics (archive link)
 Decree 260 national anthem
 Sobre los verdaderos simbolos patrios de Chile simbolospatrios.cl 
 Chile National Anthem, full lyric, MP3 format, vocal and instrumental 

Spanish-language songs
Chile
National symbols of Chile
National anthems
National anthem compositions in C major
1847 in Chile